Harold Freeman was a rugby union international who represented England from the years 1872 to 1874.

Early life
Harold Freeman was born on 15 January 1850 in Dursley, Gloucestershire.

Rugby union career
Freeman made his international debut on 5 February 1872 at The Oval in the England vs Scotland match.
Of the three matches he played for his national side he was on the winning side on two occasions.
He played his final match for England on 23 February 1874 at The Oval in the England vs Scotland match.

References

1850 births
1916 deaths
England international rugby union players
English rugby union players
People from Dursley
Rugby union players from Gloucestershire
Rugby union three-quarters